"Tell Me When Did Things Go So Wrong" is a song by the American alternative rock group The Smithereens, appearing on their fourth album Blow Up. Despite not being released as a single, the song charted in the United States.

Charts

References 

1991 songs
The Smithereens songs
Song recordings produced by Ed Stasium
Songs written by Pat DiNizio